Furs of Valencia were the laws of the Kingdom of Valencia during most of the Middle Ages and early modern Europe. The laws were a series of charters which, altogether, worked similarly as a modern Constitution does now. Thus, they defined the position of and checks and balances between the Royal House, the nobility, the Catholic ecclesiastic and the judicial procedures. The first codifications are based in the Usages of Barcelona, Costums of Lleida, and the Furs of Aragon.

They were promulgated by the first King of Valencia, James I of Aragon in 1261 at the newly created Valencian Parliament; he then subjected the title of King of Valencia to an oath of office before the Parliament, sworn on the Furs.

The Furs were valid for more than four centuries, until they were abolished by means of the Nueva Planta decrees signed by Philip V of Castile in 1707. Following the agreed amendment to the Statute of Autonomy of the Valencian Community in 2006, some distinct usages of the civil law used by the Furs are scheduled to regain binding legal authority in this territory.

See also
 Kingdom of Valencia
 List of Valencian monarchs
 Generalitat Valenciana
 Valencian Parliament

References 

Legal codes
History of the Valencian Community
Crown of Aragon
Legal history of Spain
1260s in law
1260s in Europe
1261 in Europe
13th century in Aragon